Kasganj City railway station is a small railway station in Kasganj district, Uttar Pradesh. Its code is KJC. It serves Kasganj city. The station consists of two platforms.

References

Railway stations in Kasganj district
Izzatnagar railway division
Kasganj